The Human Values and Mental Health Foundation is a non-governmental charitable organization in Turkey. It was established on March 20, 2003 by the Turkish psychiatrist and medical scientist Nevzat Tarhan. The foundation is active in the fields of education, healthcare and culture.

The board of directors is currently chaired by Nevzat Tarhan.

Education

Üsküdar University

Health

NPİSTANBUL Neuropsychiatry Hospital.

Publications

PsikoHayat Magazine

See also 
 Üsküdar University
 Nevzat Tarhan
 NPİSTANBUL

References

Foundations based in Turkey
2003 establishments in Turkey
Organizations based in Istanbul